Pournami Alaigal is a 1985 Indian Tamil-language legal thriller film produced, written and directed by M. Bhaskar. The film stars Sivakumar, Ambika and Revathi, with Major Sundarrajan, Sivachandran and A. R. S. in supporting roles. It was released on 12 January 1985 and emerged a commercial success. The film was remade into Telugu as Sravana Sandhya and in Hindi as Majaal.

Plot 

Rajesh, his wife Radha, and Radha's father Ethiraj are advocates. However, Rajesh is frequently not cared for by his father-in-law and wife. Unlike Rajesh, Radha and Ethiraj are famous and rich lawyers in the town; Rajesh just assists them for their respective cases, by preparing their case documents. The public are hardly recognising Rajesh. Rajesh who desired for own recognition and fame for self, sees Gnanaraj, a wealthy businessman for some petty cases. However, Gnanaraj a close friend of Ethiraj despises him and suggests finding a big case himself for good recognition.

One day, Deepa comes from Trichy, murders Gnanaraj with her husband Inspector Lawrence's revolver, in a daylight public event, and surrenders herself to the police station, Inspector Mahendra. Church Father Michael seeks help from Ethiraj to defend Deepa. However, Ethiraj refuses to take over the case. Michael reveals that he knows Gnanaraj was unable to reveal Gnanaraj's true colours better than anyone else and requests to defend Deepa. Rajesh takes this opportunity to take the case and defend Radha. Rajesh argues with his wife Radha and Ethiraj and leaves the house. He further moves to Michael and continues his case in court.

During the case proceedings, Rajesh proves that Deepa is mentally disturbed due to her childhood incident. Lawrence further reveals in court, that Deepa, behaves violently every time during their intimacy, throughout their four years of marriage. Due to this, Lawrence announces in court, that he is going to divorce his wife Deepa. The rest of the plot goes on the case proceedings, Deepa, Radha, and Rajesh's relationship.

Cast 
 Sivakumar as Rajesh
 Ambika as Radha
 Revathi as Deepa
 Major Sundarrajan as Ethiraj
 Sivachandran as Gnanaraja
 Nizhalgal Ravi as Inspector Lawrence
V. Gopalakrishnan as the Inspector Mahendra
 A. R. S. as Church Father Michael
 Sumitra

Production 
Pournami Alaigal was produced, written and directed by M. Bhaskar under Oscar Movies. Cinematography was handled by Viswam Nataraj, and editing by M. Vellaichami. The court scenes were shot on a set created at Vijaya Vauhini Studios. A dialogue written by Bhaskar, "Aalamarathukku keezhe edhuvum varaladhu" (Nothing grows under a banyan tree) is a South Indian proverb.

Soundtrack 
The music is composed by Shankar–Ganesh. The song "Thein Paayum" was originally written for Thandikkappatta Nyayangal (1983).

Release and reception 
Pournami Alaigal was released on 12 January 1985. The film was a commercial success, running for over 100 days in theatres. Jayamanmadhan of Kalki wrote it's the waxing moon, the full moon needs a little more thought and concluded that director should show his talent in the next picture.

References

External links 
 

1980s legal films
1980s Tamil-language films
1985 thriller films
Films directed by M. Bhaskar
Films scored by Shankar–Ganesh
Indian legal films
Legal thriller films
Tamil films remade in other languages